Alexandra (Alex) Armstrong  is the chairwoman and founder of Armstrong, Fleming, & Moore. Armstrong was the first person to earn the Certified Financial Planner certification in Washington, D.C.

Biography
Born and raised in the Washington, D.C., area. Alexandra Armstrong's father died when she was 9 years old. She attended Stone Ridge School in her early years, and went to Newton College of the Sacred Heart for her undergraduate degree.

Armstrong began her financial services career with stock brokerage firm Ferris & Company as a secretary to Julia Walsh, the first Washington woman to be successful in the brokerage business. In 1977, Walsh left Ferris & Company to start her own firm, and Armstrong made the transition along with her. When Walsh exited and sold her firm several years later, Armstrong started her own financial planning firm and broker-dealer in 1983.

In 1993, she co-authored On Your Own: A Widow's Passage to Emotional and Financial Well-Being with Dr. Mary Donahue, now in its 5th edition.

Serving financial planning
In addition to her work  in her businesses, Armstrong served for seven years on the national board (1980–1987) for the International Association of Financial Planners, one of the predecessor organizations to the Financial Planning Association. Armstrong was also the first female president and chairwoman of the organization.

Armstrong is a founding member and ongoing board member for the Foundation for Financial Planning in 2000, and was a chairwoman of the non-profit organization as well.

Outside activities
In addition to her work in financial planning, Armstrong is active outside the financial services industry. She was the first (and only) female president of the National Capital Area Council of the Boy Scouts of America, and is also a past treasurer of the national board for Reading Is Fundamental. Armstrong has also served on the Board of Visitors of Georgetown University School of Business Administration, and was president of the National Association of Women Business Owners, Washington, D.C., and also the International Women's Forum of Washington, DC.

Accolades
In 1985, Armstrong received the Award of Excellence in Commerce from Boston College Alumni Association. In 1994, she received the Alumni of the year award from Stone Ridge, her alma mater.

In 2004, Armstrong was the first woman to receive the P. Kemp Fain, Jr. award from the Financial Planning Association.

In 2006, she was inducted into the Washington Business Hall of Fame.

References

Financial advisors
Living people
Year of birth missing (living people)